Rudolf Mansfeld (17 January 1901, Berlin – 1960) was a German botanist and agricultural scientist.

For more than twenty years, he worked as a curator at the Botanical Garden and Botanical Museum in Berlin-Dahlem. Here he specialized in studies of Orchidaceae (orchids) and Euphorbiaceae (spurges). Following World War II, by way of a request from agriculturalist Hans Stubbe (1902-1989), he accepted a position as a laboratory technician at the Gatersleben Institute. In 1949 he succeeded Werner Rothmaler (1908-1962) as departmental director. During his last ten years at Gatersleben, he was in charge of the department of systematics.

Works 
As an agricultural scientist, he developed principles for the classification of cultivated plants, and also provided a scientific basis towards the establishment and preservation of large collections of cultivated plants (gene banks). He is remembered for the encyclopedia, Verzeichnis landwirtschaftlicher und gärtnerischer Kulturpflanzen (ohne Zierpflanzen), later translated into English and published as "Mansfeld's Encyclopedia of Agricultural and Horticultural Crops". Other noted writings by Mansfeld include:
 Figuren-Atlas zu den Orchideenflora der südamerikanischen Kordillerenstaaten, 1929 (with Rudolf Schlechter) - Atlas of orchids from the South American Cordillera.
 Figuren-Atlas zu den Orchidaceen von Deutsch-Neu-Guinea, 1929 (with Rudolf Schlechter) - Atlas of orchids from German New Guinea.
 Die Technik der wissenschaftlichen Pflanzenbenennung; Einführung in die Internationalen Regeln der botanischen Nomenklatur, 1949 - The technique of scientific plant names; introduction to the International Rules of Botanical Nomenclature.
 Vorläufiges Verzeichnis landwirtschaftlich oder gärtnerisch kultivierter Pflanzenarten, 1959 - Provisional list of agricultural/horticultural cultivated plant species.

References 

1901 births
1960 deaths
Scientists from Berlin
German agronomists
20th-century German botanists
20th-century agronomists